James Michael Hart (born December 20, 1951) is a former Major League Baseball outfielder. Following his major league career, Hart has had a long career as a minor league manager and coach.

Sources

Retrosheet
Venezuelan Professional Baseball League

1951 births
Living people
Alma Scots baseball players
Baseball players from Michigan
Charleston Charlies players
Columbus Clippers players
Denver Bears players
Fort Lauderdale Yankees managers
Jamestown Falcons players
Leones del Caracas players
American expatriate baseball players in Venezuela
Major League Baseball outfielders
Omaha Royals players
Québec Carnavals players
Quebec Metros players
Reading Phillies managers
Rochester Red Wings players
Sportspeople from Kalamazoo, Michigan
Texas Rangers players
Toledo Mud Hens players
Tucson Toros players
West Palm Beach Expos players